Dylan Riley Jacob Snyder (born January 24, 1997) is an American actor, filmmaker, and Twitch streamer. Beginning his acting career in community theatre at the age of five, Snyder is known for his acting, singing, and dancing abilities, starring as Young Tarzan in the 2006 Broadway musical, Tarzan, as Timmy in the 2009 feature film, Life During Wartime and as Milton on the Disney XD comedy series Kickin' It.

Early life
Snyder was born in Tuscaloosa, Alabama, the son of Ashley and Les Snyder.  Snyder has one sibling, an older sister named Cassidy.  His older sister was involved in community theatre, and he grew up attending her musical theatre rehearsals.  At the age of four, a director, Brent Jones, noticed he could take direction, and at the age of five, his family began letting him audition, leading to his first speaking role as "Tiny Tim" in a community theatre production of A Christmas Carol.

Snyder's appearance as "Tiny Tim" caught the attention of local actor, writer and director, Tina Fitch, who was impressed with his work and would go on to cast him in several University of Alabama (U of A) productions whenever they needed a child performer.  Some of his early community theatre credits include "Dill Harris" in Theatre Tuscaloosa's production of To Kill a Mockingbird, "Michael Darling" in Theatre Tuscaloosa's production of Peter Pan, "Buster" in the U of A's production of Cat on a Hot Tin Roof, "Young Pippin" in the U of A's production of Pippin and "Billy Moore" in the U of A's production of Assassins.

In 2003, the Snyder family moved to Petal, Mississippi.  With his boy soprano range, Snyder performed with the Mississippi Boys Choir and the Hattiesburg Civic Light Opera.  In 2005, he was selected for the American Boys Choir; however, it was during this time that Hurricane Katrina devastated much of Mississippi, prompting the Snyder family to move back to Alabama where family friend, Tina Fitch, suggested he go to New York City to try his luck in professional theatre.

Career
In August 2005, Snyder and his mother began preparations to make the move to New York City and five months later, on his ninth birthday, Snyder and his mother settled into a Manhattan apartment, while his father remained at his job in Mississippi and his sister attended college in Alabama.  He soon began going on professional auditions and, after competing with hundreds of boys for the role, landed the part of "Young Tarzan" in Disney's Broadway musical adaptation of Tarzan.  After landing the part, Snyder studied gymnastics to meet the physical demands of the role and worked with a Disney vocal coach to learn to project his voice.  Snyder made his Broadway debut as "Young Tarzan" in September 2006 and, as is typical with demanding children's roles on Broadway, alternated in the role with Alex Rutherford, appearing in a total of 169 performances until the show closed in July 2007.

While living in New York, Snyder continued to develop his musical theatre talents, taking ballet lessons with Yuka Kawazu, tap dance lessons with Janine Molinari, voice lessons with Richard Lissamore, dialect lessons with Amy Stoller, and etiquette lessons at the Etiquette School of Manhattan.  During this time he began landing work as a model, appearing in print advertorials for H&M and Lord & Taylor and in commercials for Univest Bank, Benadryl and Chuck E. Cheese's, as well as breaking into television, landing lead roles in the Sesame Street segments, "Jet Side Story" and "Casablanca", as well as voicing the roles of "Griffin" and "Hound Dog" in two episodes of the Nickelodeon animated series, Wonder Pets!  In February 2009, Snyder made his film debut portraying "Leo Amatog", an autistic boy who encounters a self-absorbed Chicago architect during an overnight bus trip in the short film, Valley of the Moon.

In September 2009, Snyder appeared as "Timmy Maplewood" in Todd Solondz' dramatic comedy, Life During Wartime.  Touring the film festival circuit for almost a year before getting a limited release in July 2010, the black comedy tackled such controversial subjects as suicide, incest and pedophilia.  The film earned critical acclaim for its director as well as accolades for Snyder, with Variety critic Todd McCarthy writing "The most compelling character this time around is Timmy (Dylan Riley Snyder)",  and after commending the film's "superb" cast, McCarthy reserved his highest praise for Snyder, writing "Most heart-wrenching of all is young, freckle-faced Snyder, playing a still prepubescent kid forced to cope with the messiest of adult problems and faced with potential psychological issues he can't possibly digest."

In November 2009, Snyder returned to the New York stage portraying "Young Horace Robedaux" a role based on the father of Pulitzer Prize winning author, Horton Foote in the epic nine-part off-Broadway production of The Orphans' Home Cycle.  The show was critically acclaimed and Snyder, along with the rest of the cast, creative team and producers, was honored with a special Drama Desk Award saluting "the breadth of vision, which inspired the exceptional direction, performances, sets, lighting, costumes, music and sound that made The Orphans' Home Cycle the theatrical event of the season."  The play itself would also go on to win the Outer Critics Circle Award and the New York Drama Critics' Circle Award, and ran until May 2010.

In the summer of 2010, Snyder landed his first comedic role, co-starring as awkward honors student turned karate competitor, Milton Krupnick on the Disney XD original comedy series, Kickin' It.  Snyder had no martial arts experience prior to landing the role, and when asked about the karate aspect of the show, Snyder explained "When we need to do karate on the show we have choreographers teaching us the moves, but I really enjoy doing the kicks. I lived in New York for five years prior to this and while I was there I did mainly theater. I did a lot of dance so getting into karate was a little easier for me."  The pilot was filmed in the summer of 2010, and in November of that year, Snyder and his mother moved to Los Angeles when Disney XD announced it had green-lit the series.  Kickin' It premiered in June 2011, and quickly became Disney XD's number 1 original series in the network's history.  In September 2011, Disney XD announced that the show had been renewed for a second season.  The network announced on November 5, 2012 that the series had been renewed for a third season and would go into production in January 2013.

Dylan Riley Snyder later worked on wife Allisyn Ashley Arm's YouTube series Astrid Clover where he portrays Astrid's boom operator named Boom Guy.

In 2015, Snyder starred in Mamaboy as Milton, the snoopy school newspaper editor/reporter. Mamaboy is about a high school student who must hide the fact that he has become pregnant from his family, friends and the school faculty, including his baseball coach (played by Gary Busey).

Personal life
Snyder lived in Los Angeles with his mother during filming for Kickin' It while his father and sister still resided in Alabama.  He is a former member of the Boy Scouts of America as well as one of the founding members of Broadway Kids Care.  In 2011, Snyder listed his hobbies as Rubik's Cubes, origami, juggling, billiards and chess.

In December 2014, Snyder started a relationship with Sonny with a Chance actress Allisyn Ashley Arm. They got engaged on New's Year's Day 2019 and married on September 18 of that year.

Filmography

Awards

References

External links 
 
 
 
 
 Dylan Riley Snyder at TV Guide
 Dylan Riley Snyder in Playbill

1997 births
21st-century American male actors
American child models
American male child actors
American male film actors
American male musical theatre actors
American male television actors
Living people
Male actors from Alabama
Male actors from Mississippi
Male actors from New York City
People from Manhattan
People from Petal, Mississippi
People from Tuscaloosa, Alabama